KPNW (1120 AM) is a radio station broadcasting a news/talk format. Licensed to Eugene, Oregon, United States, the station serves the Eugene-Springfield area, and calls itself "Newsradio 1120 and 93.7".  The station is owned by Bicoastal Media and features a local morning show on weekdays followed by nationally syndicated programs from Compass Media Networks, Genesis Communications Network, Premiere Networks, Radio America, and Westwood One.  KPNW carries Fox News at the beginning of each hour.  The station, along with Portland's KOPB-FM, is Oregon's primary entry point for the Emergency Alert System.

The transmitter for KPNW is located on Southern Hideaway Hills Road. In order to protect the Class A station on 1120 AM, KMOX in St. Louis, Missouri, KPNW uses a directional antenna full time to cover the Western parts of Oregon in daytime and much of the West Coast at night.

Programming
Weekday mornings on KPNW begin with "Wake Up Call" with local hosts Rob Holloway and Bill Lundun. Syndicated programming on the station includes Markley, Van Camp, & Robbins, Lars Larson (a one-time news intern at KPNW), Dana Loesch, Alex Jones, and Coast to Coast AM with George Noory.

Weekends include shows on gardening, home repair, the outdoors, beer, wine and cooking. Glenn Beck is carried on Saturday afternoons.  Sunday mornings feature religious shows and Sunday evenings include Bill Cunningham.  Some weekday shows are also repeated on weekends.

History
KPNW was first licensed on May 17, 1962, under the call sign KPIR, on 1500 kHz. It transmitted with a power of 10,000 watts daytime only and used a nondirectional antenna. The call sign was changed to KPNW on September 25, 1967; shortly afterward, the station's owner, Emerald Broadcasting Corporation, changed its name to Pacific Northwest Broadcasting Corporation.

KPNW moved to the current 1120 kHz, increased power to 50,000 watts full-time and began using a directional antenna in May 1969. The directional antenna is necessary to avoid causing interference to KMOX in St. Louis, Missouri, which is the dominant Class A station on the same frequency.  At 50,000 watts full-time, KPNW is the most powerful AM station on the West Coast between San Francisco and Portland, Oregon.

Translator
KPNW also broadcasts on the following translator:

References

External links
KPNW official website

FCC History Cards for KPNW

PNW
News and talk radio stations in the United States
1962 establishments in Oregon
Radio stations established in 1962